Clifford Harling (first ¼ 1907 – unknown) was an English professional rugby league footballer who played in the 1930s. He played at club level for Castleford (Heritage No. 96).

County League appearances 
Clifford Harling's birth was registered in Pontefract district, West Riding of Yorkshire, England.

Playing career

County League appearances
Clifford Harling played in Castleford's victory in the Yorkshire County League during the 1932–33 season.

References

External links
Search for "Harling" at rugbyleagueproject.org
Clifford Harling Memory Box Search at archive.castigersheritage.com
Cliff Harling Memory Box Search at archive.castigersheritage.com

1907 births
Castleford Tigers players
English rugby league players
Place of death missing
Rugby league players from Pontefract
Year of death missing